B. Ram was an Indian politician and leader of Communist Party of India from Himachal Pradesh. He represented Baijnath constituency from 1967 to 1972.

References

Communist Party of India politicians from Himachal Pradesh
Himachal Pradesh MLAs 1967–1972
Year of birth unknown